Ben Nevis Goes East is a 1954 comedy novel by the British writer Compton Mackenzie. It features characters introduced in Mackenzie's The Monarch of the Glen. Donald MacDonald of Ben Nevis and his friend Kilwhillie head to British India in order to save his nephew from what is considered a disastrous marriage to a divorced woman.

References

Bibliography
 David Joseph Dooley. Compton Mackenzie. Twayne Publishers, 1974.

1954 British novels
Novels by Compton Mackenzie
Novels set in Scotland
Novels set in India
Chatto & Windus books